Berodia is one of nine parishes (administrative divisions)  in Cabrales, a municipality within the province and autonomous community of Asturias, in northern Spain.

The Díaz Inguanzo Palace or Palacio de la Torre is located in a valley, near the Iglesia de Sta. María Magdalena (Church of Mary Magdalene) and a few hundred meters from the town. The palace was designated as a historic monument in 1994.

Villages
 Berodia 
 Inguanzo

References

Parishes in Cabrales